The chestnut-headed tesia (Cettia castaneocoronata) is a small insectivorous songbird formerly of the "Old World warbler" family but nowadays placed in the bush warbler family (Cettiidae).

Location and habitat 

It is found in Bangladesh, Bhutan, China, India, Laos, Myanmar, Nepal, Thailand, and Vietnam. Its natural habitats are subtropical or tropical moist lowland forest and subtropical or tropical moist montane forest.

Taxonomy 
The chestnut-headed tesia was formally described by the English army officer and zoologist Edward Burton in 1836 under the binomial name Sylvia castaneocoronata. The specific epithet combines the Latin castaneus meaning "chestnut-coloured" and coronatus meaning "crowned". Formerly placed in the genus Tesia, a molecular phylogenetic study published in 2011 found that the chestnut-headed tesia was embedded in a clade containing members of the genus Cettia.

Three subspecies are recognised:
 C. c. castaneocoronata (Burton, 1836) – Himalayas and northeast India to south China and north Laos
 C. c. abadiei (Delacour & Jabouille, 1930) – north Vietnam
 C. c. ripleyi (Deignan, 1951) – Yunnan (south China)

References

External links
 Xeno-canto: audio recordings of the chestnut-headed tesia

chestnut-headed tesia
Birds of North India
Birds of Nepal
Birds of Eastern Himalaya
Birds of Central China
Birds of Yunnan
Birds of Myanmar
chestnut-headed tesia
Taxonomy articles created by Polbot